The 1970 Five Nations Championship was the forty-first series of the rugby union Five Nations Championship. Including the previous incarnations as the Home Nations and Five Nations, this was the seventy-sixth series of the northern hemisphere rugby union championship. Ten matches were played between 10 January and 18 April. It was contested by England, France, Ireland, Scotland and Wales.

The England v Wales game at Twickenham was notable for two injuries. Robert Calmet, the French referee, had to leave the field at half time and was replaced by Johnny Johnson of England. Then, with 15 minutes to go, Gareth Edwards of Wales left the field injured. In doing so, it was the only time in his Welsh international career that Edwards failed to finish a game. Chico Hopkins of Maesteg took over, and not only set up a try for JPR Williams, but then helped create history when he scored himself in injury time. It was the first try scored by a replacement player, to be awarded by a replacement referee at international level.

Participants
The teams involved were:

Table

Squads

Results

External links

The official RBS Six Nations Site

Six Nations Championship seasons
Five Nations
Five Nations
Five Nations
Five Nations
Five Nations
Five Nations
 
Five Nations
Five Nations
Five Nations
Five Nations